This is a list of places on the Victorian Heritage Register in the Rural City of Swan Hill in Victoria, Australia. The Victorian Heritage Register is maintained by the Heritage Council of Victoria.

The Victorian Heritage Register, as of 2021, lists the following six state-registered places within the Rural City of Swan Hill:

References

Swan Hill
+
+